Mateo Pablo Musacchio (born 26 August 1990) is an Argentine former footballer who plays as a central defender.

He spent most of his professional career with Villarreal after signing as a 19-year-old, going on to appear in 249 competitive matches and score seven goals over seven La Liga seasons. In 2017 he joined Milan and, four years later, signed with Lazio also of the Italian Serie A.

Musacchio made his full debut for Argentina in 2011.

Club career

River Plate
A product of Club Atlético River Plate's youth system, Musacchio was born in Rosario, Santa Fe, and he made his first-team debut as a 16-year-old during the 2006–07 season, making four appearances. He was part of the squad that won the Clausura the following year, but did not feature in any games.

Villarreal
In August 2009, Musacchio moved to Villarreal CF in Spain, initially being assigned to the B team in the second division. He made his official debut on 5 September in a 3–1 loss at Córdoba CF as the reserves overachieved in their first season ever in that tier, eventually finishing seventh.

On 13 February 2010, shortly after ceasing to be a non-EU player, Musacchio made his La Liga debut by playing the last 15 minutes in a 2–1 home win against Athletic Bilbao. From that moment onwards he was permanently promoted to Villarreal's first team, successively surpassing more experienced Iván Marcano and Gonzalo Rodríguez – the latter his compatriot – in the defensive pecking order.

Musacchio dealt with several injury problems during his spell at the Estadio El Madrigal.

Milan
On 30 May 2017, eight days after passing his medical, Musacchio moved to Italian club A.C. Milan after signing a four-year contract. He contributed 15 Serie A appearances in his first season, with the subsequent qualification to the UEFA Europa League after a sixth-place finish.

Following Leonardo Bonucci's departure to Juventus F.C. and Mattia Caldara's two long-term injuries, Musacchio became a starter, oftentimes partnering up with the team's newly-appointed captain Alessio Romagnoli. In June 2020, just before the post-pandemic restart of the league competition in Italy, he underwent surgery on his left ankle and missed the remainder of games. 

Musacchio played his first match in ten months on 12 January 2021, featuring 62 minutes in a 0–0 penalty shootout victory over Torino F.C. in the round of 16 of the Coppa Italia.

Lazio
On 27 January 2021, S.S. Lazio announced the signing of Musacchio on a permanent deal.

International career
Musacchio was first called by the Argentina national team in May 2011, as manager Sergio Batista only selected players under 25 for friendlies with Nigeria and Poland. He made his debut against the former on 2 June, in a 4–1 defeat.

In 2017, Gianni De Biasi asked Musacchio if he would be interested in playing for Albania of which he was the manager, but the player declined as he wished to represent his country of birth.

Style of play
A press release of A.C. Milan described Musacchio as a "very physical centre back" with character and agility. Additionally, the article highlighted his marking and blocking abilities, and that he liked to start moves and play short passes."

Personal life
Musacchio's paternal grandparents were of Albanian origin, being Arbëreshë from Portocannone in lower Molise region, Italy. The surname Musacchio originated from the Muzaka region in south-central Albania, and was widely used in the Albanian community in Italy.

Career statistics

Club

International

Honours
River Plate
Argentine Primera División: Clausura 2008

References

External links
Argentine League statistics  

1990 births
Living people
Argentine people of Arbëreshë descent
People of Molisan descent
Footballers from Rosario, Santa Fe
Argentine footballers
Association football defenders
Argentine Primera División players
Club Atlético River Plate footballers
La Liga players
Segunda División players
Villarreal CF B players
Villarreal CF players
Serie A players
A.C. Milan players
S.S. Lazio players
Argentina youth international footballers
Argentina under-20 international footballers
Argentina international footballers
Argentine expatriate footballers
Expatriate footballers in Spain
Expatriate footballers in Italy
Argentine expatriate sportspeople in Spain
Argentine expatriate sportspeople in Italy